The flag of the Assembly of the Republic is the flag of the unicameral parliament of Portugal, the Assembly of the Republic.

History

The idea of the flag began as a proposal by the president of the Assembly at the time, Jaime Gama. The flag was established in 2006 by Resolution of the Assembly of the Republic No. 73, dated 14 December 2006 and published on 28 December 2006 in issue number 248 of the Diário da República. It was hoisted for the first time on 3 January 2007 on the balcony of the Salão Nobre of the São Bento Palace.

See also
Flag of Portugal
List of Portuguese flags

References

Flags of Portugal
Assembly of the Republic (Portugal)